David W. Márquez (born 1946) is an American lawyer and politician, and the former attorney general of the state of Alaska. He is the Senior VP and COO of NANA Development Corporation, an Alaska native corporation, owned by the Iñupiaq people of northwest Alaska.

Early life and education 
Márquez was born in Janesville, Wisconsin. He graduated from Northwestern University and the University of Wisconsin Law School, and was admitted to the Alaska Bar Association in 1973.

Career 
After a career working in the oil industry, including jobs doing land title work for the Trans-Alaska Pipeline, as general counsel for the pipeline operator Alyeska Pipeline Service Company, and later ARCO. Márquez then moved into politics, serving as Chief Assistant Attorney General, Legislative and Regulations Section in the Alaska Department of Law, and the Acting Deputy Attorney General for the Civil Division.

On March 31, 2005, Governor Frank Murkowski appointed Márquez as Alaska Attorney General. He served as Attorney General until Sarah Palin took office as the new governor of Alaska on December 4, 2006.

References

Politicians from Janesville, Wisconsin
Alaska Attorneys General
Living people
1946 births
University of Wisconsin Law School alumni
Northwestern University alumni
American chief operating officers